Qi Xin (born November 3, 1926) is a Chinese author and member of the Chinese Communist Party (CCP), who wrote various articles on her husband, Chinese communist revolutionary Xi Zhongxun. She is the mother of Xi Jinping, current General Secretary of the Chinese Communist Party, also known as the paramount leader.

Early life
Qi Xin was born in Gaoyang County, Hebei on November 3, 1926. Her father, Qi Houzhi, was the head of the law bureau in the Nationalist government's Third Army during the Northern Expedition.

In 1938, during the Second Sino-Japanese War, Qi was attending a girl's middle school in Beiping, modern Beijing. After Beiping fell to the Japanese army, her elder sister Yun took her to Tunliu County, Shanxi, when Yun join the Eighth Route Army. Yun sent her younger sibling to the schoolgirl's team of the Counter-Japanese Military and Political University, which had set up a branch school in Tunliu.

Later in the winter of 1939, Qi transferred to the female cadre's branch of the Cadre's School in Changzhi County, where she served as a team leader. She participated in fighting at Yincheng and Xihuo town. Qi entered the Central Party School of the Chinese Communist Party in 1941, then was sent to Yan'an University's middle school in 1942. She married Xi Zhongxun in April 1944, then after graduating school later that year, Qi went to a rural village to work.

Career
In 1952, Qi moved with her husband to Beijing so that he could serve as head of the propaganda department. In 1953, Qi enrolled in the Marx School of Communism. After graduating, Qi continued work at the institute, which was located quite far from the family home and required her husband to look after their children. Qi visited provincial and county-level schools set-up by the communist government as a consultant. It has been suggested that this position provided her family with relatively good protection during the Cultural Revolution, when her husband was denounced, but not imprisoned. Qi was asked to accompany Xi to Luoyang in 1975, however, to look after him whilst he was still under investigation.

A documentary about Qi was made in 2001, detailing her revolutionary background, titled Loyal and Dependable——Qi Xin wife of Xi Zhongxun. The piece also emphasised the education she has given her children and the high expectations she had of their work.

Personal life
Qi met Xi Zhongxun in 1943 whilst studying at the middle school in Suide County. At the time, Xi was still married to his first wife, Hao Mingzhu, with whom he had three children. Later, the head of education at the Counter-Japanese Military and Political University wrote to Xi, introducing Qi Xin, after having met her sister and father. After sending Xi her own autobiographical introduction, the two married at the prefectural party office in Suide County on 28 April 1944. The couple had their first child in 1949, a daughter named Qiaoqiao, followed by another daughter in 1952 named An'an, and two sons named Jinping and Yuanping. Following the births of each of her children, Qi only stayed at home until the baby was weaned before returning to her work. She came home at most once each week. The family led a frugal and austere lifestyle, not having shoes for the younger sons. 

Qi's younger brother, Qi Bu (also known as Qi Ruixin) (d.1987), was vice party secretary of the China National Gold Group and a top official in the gold and mineral exploration arm of the People’s Armed Police. CCP leader Xi Jinping considered him "very close".

Qi's nephew and first cousin to Xi Jinping, the son of Qi Bu, Chai Ming was the chairman of Shenzhen ZTE Zhongxing Keyang Environmental Protection Co., Ltd. and director of GQY Video. Chai gained media attention for gambling US$39 million at Melbourne, Australia's Crown casino in one period of 18 months.

Family
Xi Zhongxun (husband) (15 October 1913 – 24 May 2002)
Qi Qiaoqiao (b. 1 March 1949)
 married Deng Jiagui (b. 1951)
Qi An'an (b. 1952)
 married Wu Lung
Xi Jinping (b. 15 June 1953)
married and divorced Ke Lingling
married Peng Liyuan (b. 20 November 1962) and have one daughter, Xi Mingze (b. 25 June 1992)
Xi Yuanping (b. November 1956)
 married Zhang Lanlan

Written works

References

External links
习近平母亲电话嘱咐儿子：挑好重担不可大意 

1926 births
Living people
People from Gaoyang County
Xi Jinping family
21st-century Chinese women writers
21st-century Chinese writers
Women in war in China
Women memoirists